Passumpsic is an unincorporated village in the town of Barnet, Caledonia County, Vermont, United States. Passumpsic has a post office with ZIP code 05861.

References

Unincorporated communities in Caledonia County, Vermont
Unincorporated communities in Vermont
Vermont placenames of Native American origin